LVAD may stand for:

 Left ventricular assist device, see Ventricular assist device
 Low-Velocity Airdrop, see HALO/HAHO